Jin Guozhang (6 June 1927 – 29 January 2019) was a Chinese pharmacologist and psychopathologist. He is considered as a pioneer of modernizing traditional Chinese medicine.

Biography
Jin was born on June 6 1927 in Yongkang, Zhejiang, China. He studied at the Department of Pharmacy, School of Sciences, Zhejiang University. He later became a researcher at the Shanghai Institute of Materia Medica, Chinese Academy of Sciences (SIMM, CAS). He also served as a professor at the School of Pharmacy, Fudan University in Shanghai. Jin was elected an academician of the CAS in 2001.

Jin systematically studied the Chinese traditional medicines, their ingredients and compositions. He also identified several important effective ingredients and their pharmacological approaches for some traditional medicines. Jin also holds several patents of Chinese medicines. He won the Ho Leung Ho Lee Prize in 2002.

Jin died on 29 January 2019 in Shanghai, at the age of 91.

References

External links
 Shanghai Institute of Materia Medica, CAS - Jin Guozhang 
 China Vitae - Jin Guozhang 

1927 births
2019 deaths
Chinese pathologists
Chinese pharmacologists
Academic staff of Fudan University
Members of the Chinese Academy of Sciences
People from Yongkang, Zhejiang
Scientists from Jinhua
Zhejiang University alumni